Azubuike Godson Okechukwu (born 19 April 1997) is a Nigerian professional footballer who plays as a midfielder for TFF First League club Çaykur Rizespor.

Club career
Born in Katsina, Okechukwu has played club football for Bayelsa United and Yeni Malatyaspor.

On 19 August 2018, Okechukwu joined Egyptian Premier League side Pyramids FC.

In January 2019, he joined Çaykur Rizespor on loan until the end of the season. On 10 July 2019, İstanbul Başakşehir confirmed, that they had signed Okechukwu on a season-long loan deal. He won the Turkish championship with the club.

In August 2020, Okechukwu signed a permanent contract with İstanbul Başakşehir. In July 2021 he moved on loan to Sivasspor. He moved on loan to Yeni Malatyaspor in January 2022.

International career
Okechukwu made his international debut for the Nigeria national team in 2016, and he was selected by Nigeria for their 35-man provisional squad for the 2016 Summer Olympics.

References

1997 births
Living people
People from Katsina
Nigerian footballers
Nigeria international footballers
Bayelsa United F.C. players
Pyramids FC players
Çaykur Rizespor footballers
İstanbul Başakşehir F.K. players
Sivasspor footballers
Yeni Malatyaspor footballers
TFF First League players
Süper Lig players
Nigeria Professional Football League players
Association football midfielders
Nigerian expatriate footballers
Nigerian expatriate sportspeople in Turkey
Expatriate footballers in Turkey
Nigerian expatriate sportspeople in Egypt
Expatriate footballers in Egypt
Footballers at the 2016 Summer Olympics
Olympic footballers of Nigeria
Medalists at the 2016 Summer Olympics
Olympic bronze medalists for Nigeria
Olympic medalists in football